Never Say Die: The Final Concert is a 2000 concert film featuring Waylon Jennings. Jennings, his health failing, played his last major concert at Nashville's historic Ryman Auditorium in January 2000. He was backed by the all-star Waymore Blues Band, whom Jennings called "the band I always wanted," and joined onstage by his wife Jessi Colter, and by guests John Anderson, Travis Tritt and Montgomery Gentry.

Track listing

Disc one
"Never Say Die" (Waylon Jennings) - 5:03
"Medley": Good Hearted Woman (Jennings, Willie Nelson)/Mamas Don't Let Your Babies Grow Up to Be Cowboys (Ed Bruce) - 4:31
"Trouble Man" (Jennings, Tony Joe White) - 3:12
"Medley": Amanda (Bob McDill)/A Couple More Years (Shel Silverstein, Dennis Locorriere) - 7:24
"Waymore's Blues" (Jennings, Curtis Buck) - 4:08
with John Anderson
"It's the World's Gone Crazy (Cotillion)" (Jennings, Silverstein) - 4:13
"Love's the Only Chain (Jessi Colter) - 4:03
with Jessi Colter
"I'm Not Lisa" (Colter) - 3:12
with Jessi Colter
"Storms Never Last" (Colter) - 4:22
with Jessi Colter
"Suspicious Minds" (Mark James) - 4:15
with Jessi Colter
"Closing In on the Fire" (T. White) - 4:20

Disc two
"I'm a Ramblin' Man" (Ray Pennington) - 4:37
with Montgomery Gentry
"Help Me Make It Through the Night" (Kristofferson) - 4:10
"Havin' a Good Time" (Jennings) - 4:25
"Shakin' the Blues" (Jennings) - 3:37
"Nothing Catches Jesus by Surprise" (Jennings, Tom Douglas) - 4:22
"Never Been to Spain" (Hoyt Axton) - 6:06
"Drift Away" (Mentor Williams) - 4:25
"I've Always Been Crazy" (Jennings) - 5:09
with Travis Tritt
"Goin' Down Rockin'" (T. White, Leann White) - 3:26
"The Weight" (Robbie Robertson) - 4:42
"Can't You See" (Toy Caldwell) - 4:54

Disc 3 (DVD)
 Never Say Die (Jennings) – 5:03
 Medley: Good Hearted Woman (Jennings, Nelson)/Mamas Don't Let Your Babies Grow Up to Be Cowboys (Bruce) – 4:31
 Trouble Man (Jennings, White) – 3:12
 Medley: Amanda (McDill)/A Couple More Years (Silverstein, Locirriere) – 7:24
 Waymore's Blues (Jennings, Curtis Buck) – 4:08
with John Anderson
 It's The World's Gone Crazy (Cotillion) (Jennings, Silverstein) – 4:13
 Love's The Only Chain (Colter) – 4:03
with Jessi Colter
 I'm Not Lisa (Colter) – 3:12
with Jessi Colter
 Storms Never Last (Colter) – 4:22
with Jessi Colter
 Suspicious Minds (James) – 4:15
with Jessi Colter
 Closing In On The Fire (White) – 4:20
 I'm a Ramblin' Man (Ray Pennington) – 4:37
with Montgomery Gentry
 Help Me Make It Through the Night (Kristofferson) – 4:10
 Havin' A Good Time (Jennings) – 4:25
 Shakin' The Blues (Jennings) – 3:37
 Nothing Catches Jesus By Surprise (Jennings, Tom Douglas) – 4:22
 Never Been to Spain (Axton) – 6:06
 Drift Away (Williams) – 4:25
 I've Always Been Crazy (Jennings) – 5:09
with Travis Tritt
 Goin' Down Rockin' (White, Leann White) – 3:26
 The Weight (Robertson) – 4:42
 Can't You See (Caldwell) – 4:54

Chart performance

Personnel
 Ritchie Albright – Drums
 John Anderson –  Guest Appearance
 Vic Anesini – Reissue Mastering
 Steven Berkowitz – A&R
 Jerry Bridges – Bass
 Thom Cadley – Reissue Mixing
 Deb Castle – Production Coordination
 Tony Castle – Engineer, Mixing Assistant, Vocal Editing
 Blake Chancey – Producer
 Jessi Colter – Piano, Vocals, Guest Appearance
 Stan Dacus – Assistant Engineer
 Wes Delk – Engineer
 Steven Herrman – Trumpet
 Jim Horn – Flute, Alto and Tenor saxophone
 John Jackson – Project Director
 Shooter Jennings – Engineer, Vocal Editing
 Waylon Jennings – Electric guitar, Vocals, Producer, Art Direction
 Greg Kane – Monitor Engineer
 Rich Kienzle – Liner Notes
 Greg Lankford – Assistant Engineer
 Kyle Lehning – Mixing
 Alex Lipsitz – Engineer, Vocal Editing
 Jenny Lynn – Fiddle, Cello
 Jordan Makow – Design
 Montgomery Gentry – Guest Appearance
 Monica Morant – Photography
 Barny Robertson – Keyboards, Vocals
 Carter Robertson – Vocals
 Charles Rose – Trombone
 Glen Rose – Photography, Cover Photo
 Art St. Germain – Editing
 Rob Santos – Reissue Producer
 Doug Sax – Mastering
 Billy Sherrill – Engineer, Vocal Editing
 Kay Smith – Artist Coordination
 Wyatt Smith – Editing
 Katie Stika – Artist Coordination
 Dylan Thomas – Author
 Travis Tritt – Guest Appearance
 Robby Turner – Acoustic guitar, Mandolin, Steel guitar, Vocals
 Rance Wasson – Rhythm guitar, Vocals
 Mark Wilder – Mastering
 Bob Wright – Engineer, Vocal Editing
 Reggie Young – Guitar

Waylon Jennings albums
Albums produced by Blake Chancey
2000 live albums
Columbia Records live albums